The 2014 season was Kelantan FA's 6th season in the Malaysia Super League and 19th successive season in the top flight of Malaysian football league system.

The campaign featured Kelantan's 3rd consecutive appearance in the AFC Cup because they were the 2013 Malaysia FA Cup's winner.

Competitions

Pre-season and friendlies

Super League 

Goal scores for Super League

5 goals

 Francis Forkey Doe
 Mohamed Shawky

4 goals

 Ahmad Fakri Saarani
 Mohammed Ghaddar
 Mohd Khairul Izuan Rosli

3 goals

 Mohd Badhri Mohd Radzi

2 goals

 Wan Zaharulnizam Zakaria

FA Cup 

Having finished as the champion of the last two consecutive seasons, Kelantan will begin their FA Cup campaign in the second round, having given a bye in the first round. The draw for the FA Cup's first and subsequent rounds was held on 29 November 2013 at Grand BlueWave Hotel, Shah Alam, Selangor. Kelantan will play against the winner of the first round match between Pahang Kuantan FA and Sabah.

Malaysia Cup

The draw for the 2014 Malaysia Cup was held on 13 July 2014 at the Dewan Perdana, National Sports Institute  and Kelantan FA was drawn into a tough group containing JDT, their opponent from last season semi final ATM and Pulau Pinang.

Malaysia Cup

Group stage

Quarter-finals

AFC Cup 

The draw for the group stage was held on 10 December 2013 at AFC House, Kuala Lumpur. Kelantan, eligible as the winner of 2013 Malaysia FA Cup, was grouped in Group G and will start the campaign against Yangon United away from home on 26 February 2014.

Player statistics

Squad 
Last updated 11 May 2014 MSLGW1, MSLGW2, MSLGW3

Key:
 = Appearances,
 = Goals,
 = Yellow card,
 = Red card
(Player names in italics denotes player that left mid-season)

Goalscorers 

13 goals

 Francis Forkey Doe

9 goals

 Ahmad Fakri Saarani

8 goals

 Mohd Badhri Mohd Radzi
 Mohd Khairul Izuan Rosli

7 goals

 Wan Zaharulnizam Zakaria

6 goals

 Mohamed Shawky
 Mohammed Ghaddar

3 goals

 Ahmad Shakir Mohd Ali

1 goal

 Muhd Nazri Ahmad
 Tengku Hasbullah Raja Hassan

Transfers

Players in 

Total spent: RM 0 million

Players out 

Total received: RM 0 million

Club officials

Coaching and medical staff 
 Manager: Haji Azman Ibrahim 
 Assistant manager: Wan Badri Wan Omar 
 Head coach: George Boateng
 Assistant coach: Mohd Hashim Mustapha and Zahasmi Ismail
 Goalkeeping coach: Ismail Chawalit Abu Bakar 
 Fitness coach: Miro Petric 
 Physiotherapist: Mohd Zainuddin Zakariar

Backroom staff 
 Kit manager: Harun Ismail 
 Media official: Md Zuki Deraman 
 Security official: Datuk Mohd Farek Abdul Ghani

Sponsorship

Shirt sponsor
This is the incomplete list of Kelantan FA's current season sponsorship:
 Hotlink 
 Syarikat Muda Osman Sdn Bhd (SMO) 
 Adabi Consumer Industries Sdn Bhd (ADABI) 
 UniKL 
 Sinar Harian 
 Tresenergy Sdn Bhd (trésenergy) 
 Konsortium E-Mutiara Berhad
 Bayam Hospitality
 Andida

Material manufacturer
 Warriors

See also
 List of Kelantan FA seasons

Notes

References

Kelantan FA
2014
Kelantan